Brian Marcil (born April 6, 1948) is a former professional football player in the Canadian Football League.

Marcil was born in Richmond, Quebec, and graduated from Loyola College in Montreal, where he starred on the Warriors' undefeated 1968 team (which has since been inducted into Concordia University's Sports Hall of Fame.)

He had a 6-year CFL career, mostly with the Calgary Stampeders (5 years and 46 games from 1970 to 1974) where he played on the Grey Cup winning 1971 team. He also had a short stint with the Montreal Alouettes (9 games in 1972) and finished his career with 2 games for the Ottawa Rough Riders in 1975.

Later Marcil would be Vice President of the Alouettes Alumni Association, play for the Montreal Irish Rugby Football Club, and go into the commercial real estate business.

References

1948 births
Living people
Montreal Alouettes players
Calgary Stampeders players
Ottawa Rough Riders players
Players of Canadian football from Quebec
Canadian football linebackers